The Radical Left Front (Metopo Rizospastikis Aristeras, MERA) was a coalition of far-left political parties in Greece.

The Radical Left Front was founded in 1999 by New Left Current (NAR), the Maoist Revolutionary Communist Movement of Greece (EKKE), the Trotskyist Workers Revolutionary Party (EEK), Youth of Communist Liberation (NKA), Independent Communist Organization of Serres (AKOS) and independent left activists. In 2004, Alternative Ecologists affiliated itself to the Front.

Electoral results

See also
Politics of Greece
List of political parties in Greece
List of Communist Parties

External links
Greek election results, via the Greek Ministry of Internal Affairs
 Revolutionary Communist Movement of Greece website
 Workers Revolutionary Party website
 Youth of Communist Liberation website

Defunct political party alliances in Greece
Defunct communist parties in Greece
Defunct socialist parties in Greece
1999 establishments in Greece
Political parties established in 1999
2004 disestablishments in Greece
Political parties disestablished in 2004
2000s in Greek politics